The Fields of November is an album of American guitarist Norman Blake, released in 1974. It was reissued in 1992 by Flying Fish along with Old and New as a double CD.

Blake later married Nancy Short, who plays cello on this release. They would release a number of duet albums throughout the years.

Reception

In his Allmusic review, critic Jim Smith called the album " a thoroughly relaxed affair that did much to establish the sound he would follow throughout the rest of his career, mixing wistful ballads with controlled instrumental material. He demonstrates his musical prowess by playing fiddle, mandolin, and dobro, as well as composing all of the album's songs."

Track listing 
All songs by Norman Blake.

Side one
 "Green Leaf Fancy"
 "Last Train from Poor Valley"
 "White Oak Swamp"
 "Ruins of Richmond"
 "Graycoat Soldiers"
 "Caperton Ferry"
 "Southern Railroad Blues"

Side two
 "Lord Won't You Help Me"
 "Krazy Kurtis"
 "Coming Down from Rising Fawn"
 "Uncle"
 "The Old Brown Case"
 "The Fields of November"

Personnel
Norman Blake – guitar, fiddle, dobro, mandolin, vocals
Charlie Collins – guitar, fiddle
Robert Arthur "Tut" Taylor - dobro
Nancy Short – cello

References

1974 albums
Norman Blake (American musician) albums
Rounder Records albums